Man Made Language (1980) is a book by Australian feminist writer Dale Spender. In it she examines numerous areas of sexism as it appears in nature and in the use of the English language, with particular focus on the way men and women talk and listen differently in couples and in mixed or single sex groups; how men have historically constructed the language; how the word man is used to refer to both men and the species; how God is always seen as male; and how intercourse is described as "penetrative" sex when penetration is something that only the man does. On the last point, Spender suggests the use of "engulfing/surrounding" sex as an alternative description of coitus from the woman's point of view.

In an editorial review published on Amazon.com, Jesse Larsen writes, "Dale Spender presents a compelling and practical analysis of the androcentric construction of the English language: its social context, vocabulary, syntax, history, and usage."

References

External links
 Introduction

1980 non-fiction books
Feminist books